Tachi Palace Hotel & Casino is an Indian casino and hotel on the Santa Rosa Rancheria in Lemoore, California.

History
The 1,100-seat Southgate Bingo Palace was built for $1 million by Paland, Inc. of Dallas, and opened on November 4, 1983. Within seven months, the construction costs had been recouped, and payments to tribal members began.

By 1986, when a $750,000 renovation was completed to make Southgate the "most luxurious bingo hall in the state", the hall was being operated by British-American Bingo, Inc., which received 45 percent of revenues, with the remainder going to the tribe. Tribal members also made up 20 percent of the hall's workforce. Revenues had grown to $5.3 million in 1987. The tribe put the money toward items including youth recreation programs, college scholarships, and construction of homes.

In 1994, the tribe took over operation of the bingo hall and renamed it as the Palace Indian Gaming Center. The tribe soon added slot machines, which grew in number to 385 as of 1997, despite ongoing efforts by the state to block them. In 2005, a major expansion was opened, and it was renamed as Tachi Palace.

The following year, a 7-story, 255-room hotel was opened on the property. The hotel is semi-circular, with plans for a second phase of construction to complete the circle.

Sporting events
World Extreme Cagefighting hosted 22 mixed martial arts events at Tachi Palace, until it was bought in 2006 by Zuffa, the parent company of the Ultimate Fighting Championship, and moved its events to Las Vegas. The casino's entertainment director, Christian Printup, then created a new MMA promotion, Palace Fighting Championship. After Printup departed in 2009, the casino formed a new promotion, Tachi Palace Fights, in conjunction with Gladiator Challenge. The tribal council decided to discontinue mixed martial arts events at the casino in December 2012, but reversed its decision in March 2013, and TPF fights resumed.  

The cancelled UFC 249 was to have been held at Tachi Palace.

Tachi Palace has also hosted many boxing events in association with promoter Goossen-Tutor, and became especially known for its women's boxing bouts.

References

External links

Native American casinos
Casinos in California
Casino hotels
Lemoore, California
Buildings and structures in Kings County, California
Mixed martial arts venues in California
Tourist attractions in Kings County, California
1983 establishments in California
Native American history of California